Senator Cullen may refer to:

John J. Cullen (1845–1896), New York State Senate
Mortimer A. Cullen (1891–1954), New York State Senate
Thomas H. Cullen (1868–1944), New York State Senate
Timothy Cullen (born 1944), Wisconsin State Senate